In representation theory, a branch of mathematics, the Whittaker model is a realization of a representation of a reductive algebraic group such as GL2 over a finite or local or global field on a space of functions on the group. It is named after E. T. Whittaker even though he never worked in this area, because  pointed out that for the group SL2(R)  some of the functions involved in the representation are Whittaker functions.

Irreducible representations without a Whittaker model are sometimes called "degenerate", and those with a Whittaker model are sometimes called "generic". The representation θ10 of the symplectic group Sp4 is the simplest example of a degenerate representation.

Whittaker models for GL2

 used Whittaker models to assign L-functions to admissible representations of GL2.

Whittaker models for GLn

for  ∈  and non-zero  ∈ . Multiplicity one states that, for  unitary irreducible, the space of Whittaker functionals has dimension at most equal to one.

Whittaker models for reductive groups

If G is a split reductive group and U is the unipotent radical of  a Borel subgroup B, then a Whittaker model for a representation is an embedding of it into the induced (Gelfand–Graev) representation Ind(), where  is a non-degenerate character of U, such as the sum of the characters corresponding to simple roots.

See also

Gelfand–Graev representation, roughly the sum of Whittaker models over a finite field.
Kirillov model

References

Ser., Vol. 100, No. 2 (1974), 171-193.

Further reading
 

Representation theory
Automorphic forms
Langlands program
E. T. Whittaker